Artist Demery (June 10, 1914 – January 5, 1995) was an American Negro league outfielder in the 1940s.

A native of Boley, Oklahoma, Demery played for the Baltimore Elite Giants in 1941. He was the father of professional baseball players Larry Demery, who played for the Pittsburgh Pirates, and Art Demery Jr, who played in the Kansas City Royals' minor league system. Demery died in Bakersfield, California in 1995 at age 80.

References

External links
 and Seamheads

1914 births
1995 deaths
Baltimore Elite Giants players
Baseball outfielders
Baseball players from Oklahoma
People from Boley, Oklahoma
20th-century African-American sportspeople
Bakersfield Indians players
Visalia Cubs players